Stenilema is a genus of moths in the subfamily Arctiinae.

Species
 Stenilema aurantiaca Hampson, 1909
 Stenilema quadrinotata Kiriakoff, 1965
 Stenilema subaurantiaca Strand, 1912

References

Natural History Museum Lepidoptera generic names catalog

Lithosiini